Cichlidogyrus berminensis is a species of monopisthocotylean monogenean in the family Dactylogyridae. It is known to infect Tilapia species, particularly Tilapia bemini, and was first found in Cameroon. It can be differentiated from its cogenerates by a short penis with a marked narrow heel, a simple and straight accessory piece that is seen to end in a large hook, and by a medium-sized pair of uncinuli.

References

Dactylogyridae
Tilapia
Animals described in 2013